Sainte-Olive is a commune in the Ain department in eastern France.

Population

People from Sainte-Olive 
 Jacques Ozanam, the French mathematician, was born on 16 June 1640 in Sainte-Olive and died on 3 April 1718 in Paris.

See also
Communes of the Ain department
Dombes

References

External links

 La Dombes and the city of Sainte Olive

Communes of Ain
Ain communes articles needing translation from French Wikipedia